The 2013 ICF Canoe Slalom World Championships took place from 11 to 15 September 2013 in Prague, Czech Republic under the auspices of International Canoe Federation (ICF) at the Prague-Troja Canoeing Centre. It was the 35th edition. Prague was the host city for the second time after hosting the event previously in 2006.

The city was awarded the event at an ICF Board of Directors meeting in Budapest, Hungary on 10 April 2010.

Medal summary

Medal table

Men

Canoe

Kayak

Women

Canoe

Kayak

References

External links
 

Canoe Slalom World Championships
World Canoe Slalom Championships
ICF Canoe Slalom World Championships
International sports competitions hosted by the Czech Republic
ICF Canoe Slalom World Championships
ICF Canoe Slalom World Championships
Canoeing and kayaking competitions in the Czech Republic
September 2013 sports events in Europe